Inna Zobova (born 28 June 1976 in Khimki, Russia) is a Russian actress, fashion model and beauty pageant titleholder who was crowned Miss Russia 1994.

Pageantry
In 1994 she  went on to compete in the Miss Universe pageant where she came in second in the National Costume competition and placed 12th overall.

Modeling and fashion
In 2001, she ranked #51 in GQ's 200 Sexiest Women in the World and in 2002, she ranked #105 in The Glamour Girls Hot 500 and in the top 20 for GQ for 2005.

In August 2002, Inna was selected among over 600 models to become the then-new spokesmodel for Wonderbra and the face of the international brand Sephora in 2004, the year she also received the "Top Model of the Year" award at the Marie Claire Fashion Awards.

In 2011, Inna Zobova participates as a fashion expert and judge, to the TV show called Top Model po-russki, which is a local version of the famous U.S. reality show America's Next Top Model.

Filmography

Acting 
 Double Zero (2004) Alexandrie
 People (2005) Tatiana
 Z Joke (2013) Isadora

Notable TV guest appearances 
 On a tout essayé (France2, 2005)
 Tout le monde en parle (France2, 2005)
 Eurotrash (Channel 4, 2005)
 Tout le monde en parle (France2, 2004)
 20 heures pétantes (Canal+, 2004)
 Miss Europe 2003 (TF1, 2003) as a Judge
 Le grand Cabaret (France2, 2003)
 Porta a Porta (RAI, 2002)

TV documentary 
 Soda (France 5, 2003)
 C'est leur destin (M6, 2002)

See also
 Wonderbra Women

References
  Constance Vergara, « Moi, Inna… », article (portrait) in Paris Match, 4 pages, August 22, 2002
 Constance Vergara, « Portraits past and present of Inna Zobova, the Russian beauty… », article (portrait) in Hello, 6 pages, December 3, 2002
  Juliette Demey, « Inna Zobova, la Wonderwoman venue du froid », article (interview) in Paris Match, 2 pages, August 31, 2003
 Marta Del Riego, « Inna Zobova Wonder Girl », article (portrait) in Marie Claire, 5 pages, February 2004
 Anna Malpas, « Russia's next Top Model », article in The St. Petersburg Times, 1 pages, April 2011

Bibliography
 Thierry Mugler, « Fashion Fetish Fantasy», Ed. Thames and Hudson, Pictures 79, 81
  Topolino, « Make up games», Ed. Assouline, Pictures 15, 27, 69
 Capella, « Magic Time » Au profit de l'association War child, Ed. Kalven, Pictures of Inna Zobova during the haute couture backstages.
 Straulino, « Straulino », Ed. daab, Pictures 57, 59
 Photo, « Spécial plus belles filles du monde », n°395, Pictures 54, 55

External links
 AskMen.com - Inna Zobova
 Inna Zobova new face of Wonderbra
 
  Interview of Inna Zobova
Inna Zobova personal site

1976 births
Living people
Miss Universe 1994 contestants
Russian beauty pageant winners
Russian female models
Moscow State University alumni